"The Six Teens" (often spelled as "The Sixteens") is a 1974 song by British glam rock band Sweet, written by Nicky Chinn and Mike Chapman, appearing on Sweet's album Desolation Boulevard. The song was Sweet's first single simply as "Sweet" (previously, the band was known as The Sweet).  The B-side is the band composition "Burn on the Flame".

Background
The song references six teenagers growing up in the revolutionary rhetoric of the 1960s. The song was the penultimate single written by Chinn and Chapman for the band and the last on which long-time producer Phil Wainman assisted.

The song features softer acoustic verses contrasted with heavier electric guitar-based choruses and was regarded something of a significant departure from the band's glam rock sound heard on previous singles. Guitarist Andy Scott, when introducing the song in his current band's live show, often states he regards it as Chinn and Chapman's best work.

Chart positions 
The single reached the top 10 in several European countries, and was the band's 10th #1 in Denmark.

Personnel 
Brian Connolly - lead vocals
Steve Priest - bass guitar, backing vocals, additional lead vocals,
Andy Scott - guitars, backing vocals
Mick Tucker - drums, backing vocals

Legacy
The Vinyl District referred to the song as "a bona fide lost glam classic".

References

Songs about nostalgia
Songs about teenagers
The Sweet songs
1974 singles
1974 songs
Songs written by Nicky Chinn
Songs written by Mike Chapman
Number-one singles in Denmark
RCA Records singles
Song recordings produced by Phil Wainman